Sulaiman is an English transliteration of the Arabic name  that means "peaceful" and corresponds to the Jewish name Hebrew: שְׁלֹמֹה‎, Shlomoh) and the English Solomon (/ˈsɒləmən/) . Solomon was the scriptural figure who was king of what was then the United Kingdom of Israel (c. 970–931 BCE) and is revered as a major prophet by Muslims.

Sulaiman may also refer to:

People with the given name Sulaiman

 Ebrahim Sulaiman Sait (1922–2005), Indian politician
 Sulaiman (Brunei) (15th century), fourth sultan of Brunei
 Sulaiman Abu Ghaith (born circa 1965), Al-Qaida's official spokesman
 Sulaiman Abdul Aziz Al Rajhi (born 1920), Saudi Arabian businessman
 Sulaiman Abdul Rahman Taib (21st century), Malaysian politician
 Sulaiman al-Barouni (1872–1940), ruler of Tripolitania
 Sulaiman Al-Fahim (21st century), United Arab Emirati businessman
 Sulaiman Areeb (died 1972), Urdu poet
 Sulaiman Awath Sulaiman Bin Ageel Al Nahdi (21st century), Yemeni extrajudicial prisoner of the United States
 Sulaiman Daud (1933–2010), Malaysian politician
 Sulaiman Hamad Al Gosaibi (21st century), Saudi Arabian businessman
 Sulaiman Ismail (21st century), American football wide receiver
 Sulaiman S. Olayan (1918–2002), Saudi Arabian businessman
 Sulaiman Tejan-Jalloh (21st century), Sierra Leonean politician and ambassador
 Sultan Sulaiman (1863–1938), fourth Sultan of Selangor
 Syed Sulaiman Nadvi (1884–1953), Pakistani historian and biographer
 Wael Sulaiman Al-Habashi (born 1964), Kuwaiti footballer
 Sulaiman, Prince of Xining (died 1351), Mongol prince
 Sulaiman bin Hashim (1983–2001), Singaporean murder victim and football player

People with the surname Sulaiman

 Ismail Sulaiman (born 1984), Omani footballer
 José Sulaimán (1931–2014), Mexican boxing official
 Mahmud Sulaiman (20th century), Malaysian general officer
 Malik Sulaiman (born 1969), Malaysian yachtsman
 Shah Muhammad Sulaiman (born 1886), Indian judge and scientist
 Omar Bin Sulaiman (21st century), Governor of the Dubai International Financial Centre
 Sultan al-Hasan ibn Sulaiman (14th century), sultan of the island of Kilwa Kisiwani
 Sunar Sulaiman (born 1979), Indonesian footballer

See also
 Solomon (disambiguation), alternative transliteration
 Suleiman, another transliteration of the Arabic name sometimes rendered as Sulaiman
 Suleman (disambiguation), another transliteration of the Arabic name sometimes rendered as Sulaiman
 Soliman (disambiguation), another transliteration of the Arabic name sometimes rendered as Sulaiman
 Soleyman (disambiguation), Persian form of the name
 Solomon (disambiguation), another transliteration of the Arabic name sometimes rendered as Sulaiman
 Pi Sulaiman,  professional software designer
 Sulaiman Mountains
 Sulaymaniyah, a city in Iraqi Kurdistan
 Salim–Sulaiman, Hindi music directors and singers in India